Heurnia is a genus of snakes belonging to the family Homalopsidae.

Species
Species:
 Heurnia ventromaculata Jong, 1926

References

Homalopsidae
Snake genera